The 2017 Circuit de la Sarthe–Pays de Loire was the 65th edition of the Circuit de la Sarthe cycling stage race. It was held in the Sarthe department between 4 and 7 April 2017 and consisted of five stages, two of which took place on the same day. It was rated as a 2.1 event on the 2017 UCI Europe Tour.

 rider Lilian Calmejane took his third stage race win of the 2017 season, with a three-second margin of victory over French national champion Arthur Vichot, riding for the  team. Calmejane took the overall lead of the race after winning the penultimate stage of the race, and maintained the lead despite Vichot's best efforts on the final stage. The overall podium was completed by Jonathan Castroviejo, a further ten seconds in arrears of Vichot.

There were final-day lead changes in both the points and mountains classifications; Calmejane was usurped by teammate Bryan Coquard in the points, after his second stage win of the race, while Ángel Madrazo overtook another  rider, Paul Ourselin, to take the victory in the mountains classification.  rider Wilmar Paredes won the young rider classification for 16th place overall, while the  won the teams classification.

Teams
Sixteen teams were invited to start the race. These included three UCI WorldTeams and thirteen UCI Professional Continental teams.

Route
The race included five stages; four road stages and an individual time trial.

Stages

Stage 1
4 April 2017 — Pouzauges to Pouzauges,

Stage 2a
5 April 2017 — Ligné to Angers,

Stage 2b
5 April 2017 — Angers to Angers, individual time trial (ITT)

Stage 3
6 April 2017 — Angers to Pré-en-Pail-Saint-Samson,

Stage 4
7 April 2017 — L'Épau Abbey to Saint-Calais,

Classification leadership table
In the 2017 Circuit de la Sarthe, four different jerseys were awarded. The general classification was calculated by adding each cyclist's finishing times on each stage. Time bonuses were awarded to the first three finishers on all stages except for the individual time trial: the stage winner won a ten-second bonus, with six and four seconds for the second and third riders respectively with the exception of Stage 2, where bonuses were six, four and two seconds respectively. Bonus seconds were also awarded to the first three riders at intermediate sprints – three seconds for the winner of the sprint, two seconds for the rider in second and one second for the rider in third. The leader of the general classification received a yellow jersey. This classification was considered the most important of the 2017 Circuit de la Sarthe, and the winner of the classification was considered the winner of the race.

Additionally, there was a points classification, which awarded a green jersey. In the points classification, cyclists received points for finishing in the top placings of a stage. On all mass-start stages; for winning a stage, a rider earned 25 points, with 20 for second, 16 for third, 14 for fourth, 12 for fifth, 10 for sixth with a point fewer per place down to a single point for 15th place. In the individual time trial, points were awarded to the top 10 riders, with 10 points for the winner and a point fewer per place down to a single point for 10th place.

There was also a mountains classification, for which points were awarded for reaching the top of a climb before other riders. Each climb was categorised as either first, second, or third-category, with more points available for the more difficult, higher-categorised climbs. For first-category climbs, the top six riders earned points; on second-category climbs, four riders won points; on third-category climbs, only the top three riders earned points. The leadership of the mountains classification was marked by a pink jersey.

The fourth jersey represented the young rider classification, marked by a blue jersey. Only riders born after 1 January 1994 were eligible; the young rider best placed in the general classification was the leader of the young rider classification. There was also a classification for teams, in which the times of the best three cyclists in a team on each stage were added together; the leading team at the end of the race was the team with the lowest cumulative time.

References

External links
 

2017 UCI Europe Tour
2017 in French sport
2017